Hoel may also refer to:

People
 Hoël I, Duke of Brittany (reigned 960–981)
 Hoël II, Duke of Brittany (c.1031–1084)
 Hoel, Count of Nantes (died 1156)
 Adolf Hoel (1879–1964), Norwegian geologist and polar researcher
 Arne Hoel (1927–2006), Norwegian ski jumper
 Brit Hoel (born 1942), Norwegian politician
 Gudmund Hoel (1877–1956), Norwegian architect
 Jørn Hoel (born 1957), Norwegian composer, guitarist and singer
 J.C. Hoel (1904–1989), co-founder of the Sturgis Motorcycle Rally
 Nils Astrup Hoel (1899–1986), Norwegian businessperson
 Oddmund Hoel (1910–1983), Norwegian politician
 Pearl Hoel (1905–2005), co-founder of the Sturgis Motorcycle Rally
 Sigrun Hoel (born 1951), Norwegian lawyer, academic, government official and feminist
 Sigurd Hoel (1890–1960), Norwegian author
 William R. Hoel (1824–1879), American Civil War Union Navy officer

Other
, several U.S. Navy ships named after William Hoel
Hoel Mountains, Antarctica
Hoel Glacier, Greenland